Solntse (Russian: Солнце; English: The Sun) is Ukrainian singer Ani Lorak eleventh studio album. The album features Lorak's Eurovision Song Contest 2008 entry "Shady Lady" as well as its Russian counterpart "С неба в небо". The album comes as a CD/DVD pack with the DVD featuring 5 videos.

Release
Recording took place at VOX Recording Studios in Athens, Greece, in 2008-2009. Composed and produced primarily by Dimitris Kontopoulos, the album's sound differs from past albums featuring a more European sounding of songs and an album built on fresh material.
 
The debut single from the album, titled "Solntse" was released in December 2008. It peaked at number 1 in both Ukraine and Russia respectively. The album also includes an English version of the song titled "I'm Alive".

The second single from the album "A Dal'she" (А дальше…; And more...) was released in 2009 and peaked at number 1 in Ukraine while it reached the top 10 in Russia. The music video for the song was shot in India, and features an Indian theme.

On November 28, 2009, the title track "Solntse" won the "Best Song of the Year 2009" award at the "Zolotoi Grammofon" awards held Moscow, Russia.

Track listing

Personnel
Ani Lorak – Vocals, Producer
Philipp Kirkorov – Executive Producer
Dimitris Kontopoulos – Sound producer, Keyboards, programming, arrangement
Victoria Halkiti – Backing vocals
Aris Binis – Recording and mastering
Paul Stefanidis Viking Lounge Mastering studio – Mastering
Janis Grigoriu – Bass guitar
Spyros Kodakis – Acoustic guitar & Electric guitar
Alkis Misirlis – Drums
Andrei Batura – Design
Andrew Davidovsky - Photography
Dmitry Peretrutov - Photography
George Kalfamanolis - Photography

Release history

References

External links

2009 albums
Ani Lorak albums